Tân Hòa may refer to several places in Vietnam, including:

Tân Hòa, Buôn Ma Thuột, a ward of Buôn Ma Thuột in Đắk Lắk Province
Tân Hòa, Biên Hòa, a ward of Biên Hòa
Tân Hòa, Hòa Bình, a ward of Hòa Bình City
Tân Hòa, Tiền Giang, a township and capital of Gò Công Đông District
Tân Hòa, Hanoi, a commune of Quốc Oai District
Tân Hòa, Vĩnh Long, a commune of Vĩnh Long
Tân Hòa, Bà Rịa-Vũng Tàu, a commune of Phú Mỹ
Tân Hòa, An Giang, a commune of Phú Tân District, An Giang Province
Tân Hòa, Bình Phước, a commune of Đồng Phú District
Tân Hòa, Buôn Đôn, a commune of Buôn Đôn District in Đắk Lắk Province
Tân Hòa, Lai Vung, a commune of Lai Vung District in Đồng Tháp Province
Tân Hòa, Thanh Bình, a commune of Thanh Bình District in Đồng Tháp Province
Tân Hòa, Hậu Giang, a commune of Châu Thành A District
Tân Hòa, Kiên Giang, a commune of Tân Hiệp District
Tân Hòa, Lạng Sơn, a commune of Bình Gia District
Tân Hòa, Bến Lức, a commune of Bến Lức District in Long An Province
Tân Hòa, Tân Thạnh, a commune of Tân Thạnh District in Long An Province
Tân Hòa, Tân Châu, a commune of Tân Châu District, Tây Ninh Province
Tân Hòa, Hưng Hà, a commune of Hưng Hà District in Thái Bình Province
Tân Hòa, Vũ Thư, a commune of Vũ Thư District in Thái Bình Province
Tân Hòa, Thái Nguyên, a commune of Phú Bình District
Tân Hòa, Trà Vinh, a commune of Tiểu Cần District

See also
The communes of Tân Hòa Đông and Tân Hòa Tây of Tân Phước District